Simón Rodríguez was a Venezuelan philosopher and educator.

Simón Rodríguez may also refer to:

People
Simão Rodrigues de Azevedo, Portuguese Jesuit priest
Simon Rodriguez de Evora, Flemish noble

Places
Simón Rodríguez Municipality, Anzoátegui, Venezuela
Simón Rodríguez Municipality, Táchira, Venezuela
Universidad Nacional Experimental Simón Rodríguez, university in Caracas, Venezuela

See also
 Samon Reider Rodríguez, Cuban footballer